Theodorus Antonius Hubertus Maria (Theo) Dobbelman (Nijmegen, 22 October 1906 – Montalivet-les-Bains, France, 7 September 1984) was a Dutch sculptor, ceramist and painter.

Dobbelman came into prominence as ceramist and leader of the experimental division of De Koninklijke Porceleyne Fles in Delft since 1956. He also taught at the Royal Academy of Fine Arts in Amsterdam.

Biography

Early life 
Dobbelman (also: Dobbelmann) was the son of soap maker and politician Pierre Dobbelmann. He initially studied chemistry at the Swiss Fribourg, where he also graduated. He settled in Amsterdam, where he befriended ceramist Just van Deventer.

From 1941 he worked with him in his company Tanagra Pottery. After the Second World War Dobbelman left the business, and he worked as an independent artist. In 1956 he became the leader of an experimental division of De Koninklijke Porceleyne Fles in Delft. The department focused on the renewal of ceramics as art form. Early pupils out there were Lies Cosijn and Jet Sielcken. One of the latest pupils out there was Simone Haak.

Later career 
Dobbelman taught ceramics associated with the Institute of Applied Art and the Royal Academy of Fine Arts, both in Amsterdam. His students included Frank van Brakel,, Hannie Mein, Francine Timmers, and Jan van der Vaart. He was president of Saint Luke Artist Association and member of Arti et Amicitiae.

Later in his life he was invested as a Knight of the Order of Orange-Nassau. Dobbelman died in France and was buried on cemetery Zorgvlied.

Work 
Over the years Dobbelman contributed with numerous designs for ceramics, bronze and terra cotta, and to publications, commissions and illustrations. In 1976 the Princessehof Ceramics Museum in Leeuwarden contributed with a retrospective of his work.

Exhibitions, a selection 
 1948. Group exhibition in Arti, Arti et Amicitiae, Amsterdam.
 1955. Sculptures in the Lijnbaan, Lijnbaan Rotterdam.
 1959. De porseleyne fles ín Paríjs, Dutch Institute in Paris.
 1965. Ceramic sculptures, indoor and outdoor, Museum Arnhem, Arnhem.

Works in the public space (selection) 
 Heerhugowaard, Untitled (1980), Granaat-Smaragd (Garnet-Emerald), at school "The Aventurine"
 Veenendaal, Untitled (1968), a ceramic cube at the base Kerkwijk

Photo gallery

See also 
 List of Dutch ceramists

References

External links 

 Theo Dobbelmann at Capriolus Contemporary Ceramics

1906 births
1984 deaths
Dutch ceramists
Dutch sculptors
Dutch male sculptors
People from Nijmegen
Knights of the Order of Orange-Nassau
20th-century ceramists